Nyazepetrovsk is a town and the administrative center of Nyazepetrovsky District in Chelyabinsk Oblast, Russia, located on the Nyazya River (a tributary of the Ufa),  northwest of Chelyabinsk, the administrative center of the oblast. Population:

History
It was founded in 1747. Town status was granted to it in 1944.

Administrative and municipal status
Within the framework of administrative divisions, Nyazepetrovsk serves as the administrative center of Nyazepetrovsky District. As an administrative division, it is, together with three rural localities, incorporated within Nyazepetrovsky District as the Town of Nyazepetrovsk. As a municipal division, the Town of Nyazepetrovsk is incorporated within Nyazepetrovsky Municipal District as Nyazepetrovskoye Urban Settlement.

References

Notes

Sources

Cities and towns in Chelyabinsk Oblast
Krasnoufimsky Uyezd
Populated places established in 1747
Monotowns in Russia